Ruth Marchant (April 1961 - December 2018) was an intermediary and forensic interviewer, and the co-founder of the organisation Triangle.  Triangle is a national organisation focused on communicating with children and young people with a wide range of needs.

Education and early career 
Marchant studied developmental psychology at the University of Sussex. She then went on to work for multiple charities and organisations working with children, such as Save the Children and Chailey Heritage School, before she set up Triangle together with occupational psychologist Mary Jones.

Working with children involved in legal proceedings 
Marchant was behind many changes in the English legal system, making it easier to work with children involved in legal proceedings.   She was the first to use a tent for a child to sit in when giving evidence in court, and was behind the practice for barristers to move to the live link room for cross-examination of children. 

She has also co-written articles on responding to very young children when they may be at risk, non-verbal communication with children giving evidence, safe-guarding disabled children, and communicating with very young children giving evidence in legal proceedings.  

Through her organisation, Triangle, she also provided support for children involved in legal proceedings.

References

External links 
The Triangle charity.

1961 births
Children's rights
Forensic scientists
Women forensic scientists
2018 deaths